Desahogo may refer to:

 Desahogo (Vico C album), 2005 
 Desahogo (Pilar Montenegro album), 2001